Hisham ibn Abd al-Malik (691 – 6 February 743) was the tenth Umayyad caliph, ruling from 724 until his death in 743.

Early life
Hisham was born in Damascus, the administrative capital of the Umayyad Caliphate, in AH 72 (691–692 CE). His father was the Umayyad caliph Abd al-Malik. His mother, A'isha, was a daughter of Hisham ibn Isma'il of the Banu Makhzum, a prominent family of the Quraysh, and Abd al-Malik's longtime governor of the Islamic holy cities of Mecca and Medina. According to the history of  al-Tabari (d. 923), Hisham was given the kunya (patronymic) of Abu al-Walid.

There is little information about Hisham's early life. He was too young to play any political or military role during his father's reign. He supposedly led the Hajj pilgrimage to Mecca once during his brother al-Walid I's reign and while there, met a respected descendant of Caliph Ali, Zayn al-Abidin. Hisham is credited by al-Tabari for leading an expedition against the Byzantines across the Caliphate's frontier in 706 and capturing a number of their fortified positions.

Hisham began to demonstrate aspirations for the caliphate at the death of his brother, Caliph Sulayman in 717. On his deathbed, Sulayman had nominated as his successor their paternal first cousin, Umar II, but kept the order secret, entrusting the revelation to his chief adviser Raja ibn Haywa. When Raja informed the Umayyad family of the decision, Hisham protested that the caliphal office was the preserve of Abd al-Malik's direct descendants and only relented from his opposition when threatened by force. He played no political or military role under Umar but is mentioned in a 10th-century biography of Umar as having issued a letter to the caliph complaining of his and his brothers' treatment under the caliph's rule. Hisham also held no posts under his brother, Caliph Yazid II.

Reign

Accession
Upon the counsel of their brother, the prominent general Maslama ibn Abd al-Malik, Yazid nominated Hisham as his successor over his own son al-Walid II, whom he had originally intended to designate as first-in-line. Hisham acceded after Yazid died in January 724. He received the news while at his Syrian desert estate, al-Zaytuna, which is identified as Qasr al-Hayr al-Gharbi, near Hisham's favored residence, al-Rusafa, which is identified as Qasr al-Hayr al-Sharqi. He was given the caliphal ring and staff by a postal messenger, after which he rode to Damascus, where he was publicly acclaimed as caliph.

Overview
Hisham inherited an empire with many different problems. He would, however, be effective in attending to these problems, and in allowing the Umayyad empire to continue as an entity. His long rule was an effective one, and it saw a rebirth of reforms that were originated by Umar bin Abd al-Aziz.

Like a-Walid I, Hisham was a great patron of the arts, and he again encouraged arts in the empire. He also encouraged the growth of education by building more schools, and perhaps most importantly, by overseeing the translation of numerous literary and scientific masterpieces into Arabic. He returned to a stricter interpretation of the Sharia as Umar had, and enforced it, even upon his own family. His ability to stand up to the Umayyad clan may have been an important factor in his success, and may point to why his brother Yazid was ineffective.

According to tradition, Hisham ordered the hadith scholar Ibn Shihab al-Zuhri (d.742) to commit the hadith he had memorized to writing.

Military activities
On the military front his empire suffered a series of setbacks, especially in the Caucasus against the Khazars (the Battle of Marj Ardabil) and in Transoxiana against the Turgesh (the "Day of Thirst" and the Battle of the Pass). Hisham sent armies to end the Hindu rebellion in Sind, and was successful when the Hindu ruler Jai Singh was killed. This allowed the Umayyads to reassert their rule over some portions of their provinces in India. Some invasions of Indian kingdoms were led by the Arab governors of Sind but they were unsuccessful.

Under Hisham's rule, regular raids against the Byzantine Empire continued. One regular commander of Arab forces was the redoubtable Maslama, Hisham's half-brother. He fought the Byzantines in 725–726 CE (A.H. 107) and the next year captured Caesarea Mazaca. He also fought the Khazars in the Caucasus. In 728, he fought for a month against the Khaqan there and defeated him. Hisham's son Mu'awiya was another Arab commander in the almost-annual raids against the Byzantine Empire. In 728, he took the fort of Samalu in Cilicia. The next year Mu'awiya thrust left and Sa'id ibn Hisham right, in addition to a sea raid. In 731, Mu'awiya captured Kharsianon in Cappadocia.

Mu'awiya raided the Byzantine Empire in 731–732 (A.H. 113). The next year he captured Aqrun (Akroinos), while Abdallah al-Battal took a Byzantine commander prisoner. Mu'awiya raided Byzantium from 734–737. In 737, al Walid ibn al Qa'qa al-Absi led the raid against the Byzantines. The next year Sulayman ibn Hisham captured Sindira (Sideroun). In 738–739, Maslama captured some of Cappadocia and also raided the Avars. Theophanes the Confessor (p. 103) states that while some Arabs raided successfully in 739 and returned home safely, others were soundly defeated at the Battle of Akroinon. He records that internal Byzantine strife (the struggle between Constantine V and the usurper Artabasdos) facilitated Arab raids by Sulayman ibn Hisham in 741–742 (p. 106) that made many Byzantines Arab captives. Al-Tabari refers to the same raid.

In North Africa, Kharijite teachings combined with natural local restlessness to produce a significant Berber revolt. In 740, a large Berber force surrounded a loyal army at Wadi Sherif, where the loyalists fought to the death. Hisham dispatched a force of 27,000 Syrians, which was destroyed in 741. In 742 Handhala ibn Safwan began successfully, but soon was besieged in Qairawan. He led a desperate sortie from the city that scattered the Berbers, killing thousands and re-establishing Umayyad rule.

Hisham also faced a revolt by the armies of Zayd ibn Ali, grandson of Husayn bin Ali, which was put down because of the betrayal of the Kufans. The Kufans encouraged Zayd to revolt. Zayd was ordered to leave Kufa and though he appeared to set out for Mecca, he returned and dwelt secretly in Kufa moving from house to house and receiving the allegiance of many people. Yusuf ibn Umar al-Thaqafi, Iraq's governor, learned of the plot, commanded the people to gather at the great mosque, locked them inside and began a search for Zayd. Zayd with some troops fought his way to the mosque and called on people to come out. He then pushed back Yusuf's troops, but was felled by an arrow. Although his body was initially buried, the spot was pointed out and it was extracted, beheaded and the head sent to Hisham and later to Medina.

In Spain, the internal conflicts of the years past were ended, and Hisham's governor, Abd al-Rahman ibn Abdallah, assembled a large army that went into France. He besieged Bordeaux and pushed to the Loire. This marked the limit of Arabic conquest in Western Europe. The wave was halted at the Battle of Tours by Charles Martel who ruled the kingdom of the Franks.

Death and succession
Hisham died on 6 February 743 (6 Rabiʽ al-Thani 125 AH). His son, Maslama, led the funeral prayers. Hisham had attempted to secure Maslama as his successor in place of Yazid II's son, al-Walid II. Hisham's initial attempts, after the Hajj of 735, to persuade al-Walid II to step down in favor of Maslama or, alternatively, to make Maslama al-Walid II's successor were rejected. Afterward, Hisham undermine al-Walid II by secretly gathering support for Maslama. The latter's nomination was supported by Maslama ibn Abd al-Malik and Hisham's maternal grandfather, Hisham ibn Isma'il, the latter's sons Ibrahim and Muhammad, as well as the sons of the tribal chief al-Qa'qa' ibn Khulayd, who were an influential family in northern Syria. Maslama's mother, Umm Hakim, also lobbied for him. Opposed to Maslama's proposed succession was Khalid al-Qasri, the governor of Iraq, to which Maslama responded by insulting him and his dead brother Asad. Maslama ibn Abd al-Malik's death in the late 730s was a major setback to Hisham's succession plans, as it represented the loss of the plan's key supporter in the Umayyad dynasty.

Al-Walid II acceded and immediately ordered his cousin, the veteran commander al-Abbas ibn al-Walid, to arrest Hisham's sons at Rusafa, near Palmyra, but expressly forbade that Maslama or his household be disturbed in deference to their old companionship and Maslama's defense of al-Walid II from Hisham.

Assessment
In general, Hisham is viewed by modern historians and the early Islamic tradition to have overseen a successful reign, on par with the similarly long reigns of the Umayyad Caliphate's founder Mu'awiya I and Abd al-Malik. In the summation of the historian Francesco Gabrieli, Hisham's rule "on the whole was glorious for the Arabs and fruitful in the development of Islamic faith and culture" and "marks the final period of prosperity and splendour of the Umayyad caliphate". By dint of his sobriety, austerity and work ethic, Hisham is held by most modern historians to have kept the Caliphate in good-standing. They largely assign blame to his successor al-Walid II, and longer-standing internal factors that Hisham could not resolve, for the Umayyad dynasty's unraveling in the few years after Hisham's death. Similarly, the Islamic tradition portrays Hisham as "a conscientious and efficient, if severe and tightfisted, administrator", according to Blankinship. In the view of the historian Hugh N. Kennedy, the Umayyad state "had never been as strong as it had been under Hisham only a decade before the final collapse" in 750.

Blankinship, on the other hand, concludes that the military disasters of Hisham's reign brought about the Umayyad dynasty's demise. The state struggled to absorb the significant losses incurred by these defeats. Its treasury was dependent on war booty and it lacked efficient means to collect tax revenue from its subjects. An unprecedented economic crisis ensued, precipitating stringent taxation efforts and a substantial reduction in spending. This caused widespread discontent throughout the Caliphate, while also failing to remedy state finances. Meanwhile, the harshness and diminishing material returns from campaigning along the frontiers sapped the enthusiasm of the provincial garrisons and further increased Hisham's dependence on the Syrian army, the bedrock of the dynasty, to the chagrin of the locally-established troops. As Syrian troops were dispatched against external forces on the frontiers and to quell major internal revolts throughout the Caliphate, they suffered the brunt of the military debacles. The Syrians were mostly Yamani and their dispersal and heavy losses disrupted the factional balance, upon which the Umayyad state depended, in favor of the Qays/Mudar of the Jazira. The Qays/Mudar became the main component of the army under Marwan II and their rout by the Khurasani troops of the Abbasids marked the end of the Umayyad dynasty.

Family
Hisham's favored wife was Umm Hakim, the daughter of Yahya ibn al-Hakam, brother of Hisham's grandfather caliph Marwan I, and Zaynab bint Abd al-Rahman, the granddaughter of the Syrian conquest commander al-Harith ibn Hisham of the Banu Makhzum. Umm Hakim, like her mother, was well-known for her beauty and love for wine. She gave Hisham five sons, including Sulayman, Maslama, Yazid al-Afqam, and Mu'awiya. 

Hisham was also married to Umm Uthman, a daughter of Sa'id ibn Khalid. The latter was a grandson of the third caliph Uthman and one of the wealthiest people of his day, who used to divide his time between Syria and Medina. Umm Uthman gave birth to Hisham's son Sa'id. His other sons were called Muhammad, Abd Allah, Marwan, Abd al-Rahman and Quraysh. He had a daughter, A'isha, to whom he granted an estate at Ras Kayfa.

See also
Marwan ibn Abd al-Malik
Yusuf ibn Umar al-Thaqafi

Notes

References

Bibliography

691 births
743 deaths
8th-century Umayyad caliphs
8th-century rulers in Asia
8th-century rulers in Africa
8th-century rulers in Europe
8th-century Arabs
Deaths from diphtheria
One Thousand and One Nights characters
Umayyad people of the Arab–Byzantine wars